The 2019 Michigan State Spartans football team represented Michigan State University in the 2019 NCAA Division I FBS football season. The Spartans played their home games at Spartan Stadium in East Lansing, Michigan, and competed as member of the East Division of the Big Ten Conference. They were led by head coach Mark Dantonio in his 13th and final season at MSU.

MSU finished the season 7–6, 4–5 in Big Ten play to finish in fifth place in the East division. The Spartans received a bid to the 2019 Pinstripe Bowl where they defeated Wake Forest 27–21.

On February 4, 2020, the school announced that head coach Mark Dantonio had resigned. On February 12, 2020, Michigan State announced the hiring of Colorado head coach Mel Tucker as the school's 25th head football coach.

Previous season
The Spartans finished the 2018 season 7–6, 5–4 in Big Ten play to finish in fourth place in the East Division. The Spartans received a bid to the 2018 Redbox Bowl where they lost to Oregon.

Offseason

2019 NFL Draft
MSU kept its streak of 79 years of having at least one player drafted in the NFL Draft alive when Justin Layne was drafted in the third round of the 2019 NFL Draft. Safety Khari Willis also was selected, in the fourth round.

Coaching changes 
On January 10, 2019, the school announced that Brad Salem would be taking over as offensive coordinator for the Spartans, replacing co-offensive coordinators Dave Warner and Jim Bollman. Warner and Bollman would remain on the staff with different roles.

Recruiting

Preseason

Preseason Big Ten poll
Although the Big Ten Conference has not held an official preseason poll since 2010, Cleveland.com has polled sports journalists representing all member schools as a de facto preseason media poll since 2011. For the 2019 poll, Michigan State was projected to finish in third in the East Division.

Personnel

Roster

Coaching staff

Schedule
Michigan State's 2019 schedule began with three non-conference home games, first against Tulsa of the American Athletic Conference, then Western Michigan of the Mid-American Conference, and finally Arizona State of the Pac-12 Conference.

In Big Ten Conference play, the Spartans played all members of the East Division and drew Northwestern, Wisconsin, and Illinois from the West Division.

Rankings

Game summaries

Tulsa

The Spartans opened the 2019 season under the lights for the second consecutive year, welcoming American Athletic Conference foe Tulsa to Spartan Stadium.

MSU received the ball first and moved right down the field, moving to the Tulsa 15 yard line before Brian Lewerke hit Connor Heyward on a swing pass for a touchdown and an early 7–0 lead. The MSU defense took over from there forcing Tulsa to punt on consecutive possessions while MSU turned the ball over on downs and was forced to punt on their next two possessions. At the start of the second half, the Spartans blocked a Tulsa punt ad took over at the Tulsa 24. However, the MSU offense could not manage more than four yards and settled for a Matt Coghlin 28 yard field goal and a 10–0 lead. DE Kenny Willekes recovered a fumble on the ensuing Tulsa possession and MSU settled for another Cochlin field goal. On the next Tulsa possession, a bad shotgun snap ended up going out the back of the Tulsa endzone for safety to give the Spartans a 15–0 lead. The MSU offense moved the ball steadily down the field again, but with fourth and one at the Tulsa nine-yard line, Rocky Lombardi was stopped short and the Spartans again turned the ball over on downs. However, MSU's defense again picked up the slack for the offense as Raequan Williams combined with Willekes for a sack, forcing a fumble that Willekes recovered in the endzone. The score pushed MSU's lead to 22–0. MSU's defense intercepted the next Tulsa pass, setting up MSU at Tulsa's 30-yard line. However, the Spartans again settled for a Coghlin field goal and a 25–0 lead. With just over two minutes remaining in the half, Tulsa moved 85 yards down the field and capped the drive with a 28-yard touchdown pass to narrow the lead to 25–7 at the half.

In the second half, the MSU defense continued its dominance forcing punts on all three of the Tulsa possessions in the third quarter. MSU's offense failed to manage much more, settling for another Coghlin field goal to push the lead to 28–7. Neither offense managed anything else for the remainder of the game as the Spartans won 28–7. The Spartans held Tulsa to -73 yards rushing, limiting the Hurricane to 80 total offensive yards. MSU's offense managed 195 yards through the air and 108 yards rushing in the easy win, but failed to score more than one touchdown.

Western Michigan

Arizona State

Northwestern

Following a stunning loss at home to Arizona State the week prior, the Spartans would open conference play on the road in an inter-divisional match up against the Northwestern Wildcats.

The Spartans would receive the opening kickoff and march directly down the field with a 9 play, 75-yard drive capped off by an Elijah Collins touchdown run of 5-yards, giving MSU an early 7–0 lead. The defense would force a punt on the ensuing Northwestern offensive possession; however, Cody White would fumble on the punt return, giving Northwestern favorable field position at the MSU 27-yard line. The Wildcats drove to the MSU 1-yard line, but were unable to score as the Spartan defense stood tall with a goal line stand, forcing a turnover on downs. Northwestern would add a field goal on their next offensive possession, bringing the score to 7–3, Michigan State. Shortly before the half, Northwestern would drive to midfield before a Hunter Johnson pass was intercepted by Josiah Scott at the MSU 38-yard line, giving the Spartan offense favorable field position with a little under 2 minutes remaining in the half. The offense would take advantage of the turnover, going on an 11 play, 62-yard drive capped off by an 11-yard touchdown pass from Brian Lewerke to Cody White. Michigan State took a 14–3 lead heading into halftime.

Michigan State would expand its lead late in the 3rd quarter after Brian Lewerke connected with Matt Seybert on an 8-yard touchdown pass, giving them a 21–3 lead. The Spartans would score again on their next possession on a Matt Coghlin 26-yard field goal (prior to this conversion, Coghlin had missed 4 straight field goal attempts). After 3 quarters of action, MSU led 24–3. Following a Drew Beasley interception, State would add to their lead early in the 4th quarter after Brian Lewerke would once again connect with Matt Seybert, this time on a 7-yard touchdown pass, giving them a 31–3 lead. Northwestern would finally score a touchdown on a Drake Anderson 2-yard run with under 3 minutes remaining, putting the final score at 31–10. With the win, the Spartans snapped a 3-game losing streak against Northwestern and Mark Dantonio earned his 110th victory as head coach at MSU, surpassing Duffy Daugherty to become the all time winningest head coach in Michigan State football history.

Indiana

After a dominating road victory over Northwestern, the Spartans returned to East Lansing for Homecoming to host rival Indiana.

After opting to receive the opening kickoff, the Spartan offense drove all the way to the Indiana 25-yard line before Matt Coghlin missed a 43-yard field goal attempt. Following a defensive stop, MSU would get the ball back and score a touchdown on an Elijah Collins 5-yard run, giving them a 7–0 lead. Several possessions later, Indiana would tie the game on a 28-yard touchdown pass to Whop Philyor from Michael Penix Jr. The Spartans would retake the lead on their next possession early in the 2nd quarter on a 5-yard touchdown pass from Brian Lewerke to Darrell Stewart Jr., giving them a 14–7 lead. Indiana would tie the game several possessions later with a lengthy 10 play, 80-yard drive capped off by a 2-yard rush touchdown by Penix Jr. After trading possessions, the Michigan State offense would receive the ball at their own 44-yard line with just under a minute left to play in the half. Brian Lewerke would guide the offense down the field, finding Darrell Stewart on a 26-yard passing touchdown with just under 30 seconds remaining in the half. The Spartans would take a 21–14 lead heading into halftime.

The Hoosiers would receive the ball to start the 2nd half and would put together another lengthy drive of 12 plays, 81-yards, and taking 6:32 off the clock, settling for a Logan Justus 26-yard field goal to put the score at 21–17, MSU. The Spartan offense would move the ball to the Indiana 46-yard line before being forced to punt, giving the ball right back to the Indiana offense who would score after a 13 play, 80-yard drive capped off by a Donovan Hale 12-yard touchdown reception from Penix Jr., giving them their first and only lead of the game at 24–21. The Spartan offense would receive great field position after a Brandon Sowards punt return of 22-yards (which was aided by a procedure penalty against Indiana that tacked on an additional 5-yards to the return) set them up at the IU 26-yard line. Several plays later, Brian Lewerke would connect with Matt Seybert on a 10-yard touchdown pass, with Michigan State retaking the lead 28–21. After a defensive stop, the Spartans would add onto their lead with a Matt Coghlin 44-yard field goal, putting the score at 31–24, MSU. The Hoosiers would tie the game at 31 apiece on their next possession on a Whop Philyor 11-yard touchdown pass from Michael Penix Jr. With 2 minutes remaining in the game, the Michigan State offense would take possession of the ball. On the first play of the drive, Brian Lewerke would connect with Darrell Stewart for a 44-yard completion, immediately putting MSU in field goal range. They would drive all the way to the Indiana 3-yard line, taking the clock all the way down to 8 seconds before Matt Coghlin would make the go ahead 21-yard field goal, giving MSU a 34–31 lead; Indiana would receive the ball with 5 seconds remaining. With time running out, Michael Penix Jr. would fumble the ball after a lateral, and Michael Dowell would recover the ball in the end zone to end the game on a defensive touchdown, giving MSU a 40–31 victory.

Ohio State

Wisconsin

Penn State

Illinois

Michigan

After its game against Maryland and having a second bye week, Michigan hosted its in-state rival, the Michigan State Spartans in the battle for the Paul Bunyan Trophy. The previous season, Michigan defeated Michigan State 21–7.[62][63]

Michigan defeated Michigan State 44–10.[64] Michigan State opened the scoring in the first quarter with a one-yard touchdown pass from Brian Lewerke to Max Rosenthal. Michigan punted on its first two possessions, but scored on each of its next eight. Michigan's first points came on the second play of the second quarter on a one-yard touchdown run from Hassan Haskins. Its next drive began on its two-yard line, and ended 12 plays and 98 yards later with a five-yard touchdown pass from Shea Patterson to Nick Eubanks. Michigan kicker Quinn Nordin converted a 28-yard field goal with 15 seconds left in the half, which made the score 17–7 in favor of Michigan at half-time. Michigan added 10 points in the third quarter on an 18-yard touchdown pass from Patterson to Donovan Peoples-Jones and a 49-yard field goal by Nordin. Michigan State scored on a 35-yard field goal by Matt Coghlin. Michigan added 17 points in the fourth quarter on a 22-yard touchdown pass from Patterson to Nico Collins, a 33-yard field goal by Nordin and a 39-yard touchdown pass from Patterson to Cornelius Johnson.[65]

Michigan's defense held Michigan State to 54 rushing yards and only 17 receptions, the Spartans' second lowest reception total of the season. Patterson's 384 yards and four touchdown passes represented career highs for him since transferring to Michigan.[63] Tom Fornelli of CBS Sports called the game "a thoroughly dominating performance by the Wolverines", noting that Michigan's 44 points "are the most it has scored in a game against Michigan State since a 45–37 victory in 2004".[66] According to MLive, the game was the most lopsided loss Mark Dantonio experienced in his 13 rivalry games, and it was also the largest margin of defeat for Michigan State against Michigan since a 49–3 loss in 2002.[67]

Rutgers

Maryland

vs. Wake Forest (Pinstripe Bowl)

Wake Forest jumped out to a 7–0 lead when quarterback Jamie Newman hit Kendall Hinton for a 29-yard touchdown pass. The Spartans scored ten unanswered points, first on a Matt Coghlin field goal and then on a 15-yard interception return by Mike Panasiuk, to take the lead, 10–7. The Demon Deacons regained the lead on a second quarter touchdown pass from Newman to Donovan Greene, making the score 14–10. The Spartans answered again, scoring a touchdown on an 8-yard scramble by quarterback Brian Lewerke to go ahead 17–14. Newman then threw his third TD pass, this time to Jack Freudenthal, putting Wake Forest up 21–17. MSU tightened the gap to 21–20 with another Coghlin field goal just before halftime. In the third quarter, the lead changed for the fifth time, as Lewerke connected with Cody White for a 10-yard touchdown pass to give MSU a 27–21 lead. MSU failed to put more points on the board with two turnovers in Demon Deacon territory and a missed field goal. However, the Spartan defense was up to the task, holding Wake Forest scoreless in the second half.

Brian Lewerke, who threw for 320 yards and one touchdown while adding 46 rushing yards and a touchdown, was named the game's Most Valuable Player. With 366 total yards, Lewerke surpassed Connor Cook as the all-time Spartans leader in yards from scrimmage.

Players drafted into the NFL

References

Michigan State
Michigan State Spartans football seasons
Pinstripe Bowl champion seasons
Michigan State Spartans football